(The Accursed Huntsman) is a symphonic poem by César Franck. The sections of the work are:

 The Peaceful Sunday Landscape
 The Hunt
 The Curse
 The Demons' Chase

The piece is scored for piccolo, 2 flutes, 2 oboes, 2 clarinets in B-flat, 4 bassoons, 4 horns, 2 trumpets in F, 2 cornets in B-flat, 3 trombones, tuba, timpani, tubular bells, cymbals, triangle, bass drum, and strings.

It was inspired by the ballad  (The Wild Hunter) by the German poet Gottfried August Bürger. It tells the story of a Count of the Rhine who dares to go hunting on a Sunday morning, in violation of the Sabbath. As the piece begins, the count defiantly sounds his hunting horn, despite the warnings of the church bells and sacred chants which call the faithful to worship. Deep in the woods, the count is cursed by a terrible voice which condemns him to be pursued by demons for eternity.

The Kennedy Center describes the story this way:

Franck's orchestration evokes the dark, fantastic atmosphere of the infernal chase. The conclusion of the piece recalls the macabre  of Hector Berlioz's Symphonie Fantastique (1830).

Franck completed  on 31 October 1882, and had the work premiered on 31 March 1883, at the Salle Érard, in a concert of the  conducted by Édouard Colonne. The same concert also presented the premiere of the symphonic poem  by Franck's pupil, Ernest Chausson.

Among the recordings of the piece, the 1962 RCA Victor recording by Charles Münch and the Boston Symphony Orchestra has long been available, first on LP and then on CD. It was recorded in Münch's last season as music director in Boston and features the orchestra's custom-made chimes in the finale.

See also
 Wild Hunt

References

 

Compositions by César Franck
Symphonic poems
1882 compositions
Music based on poems